Lyscombe Hill  (262 metres, 860 feet high) is a hill near Melcombe Bingham about 14 kilometres north-northeast of Dorchester in the county of Dorset, England. It is part of the Dorset Downs and is listed as a so-called HuMP.

Nearby on the summit ridge of the Dorset Downs are Ball Hill to the west and the Dorsetshire Gap to the east.

References 

Hills of Dorset